The 2015 United Kingdom general election in Wales was held on 7 May 2015 and all 40 seats in Wales were contested. The election for each seat was conducted on the basis of first-past-the-post.

Despite the Labour party winning the most votes in Wales, the Conservatives won across the UK.

Results overview

A full list of the results in Wales can be found in the House of Commons Library General Elections Online. The following is an overall table of results for Wales by the BBC.

Turnout statistics

1 valid vote, count of rejected ballots and total electorate come from the source(s) given in  'Table of results by constituency' below.

Results by constituency

1 The information on the winning party and the majority come from the source(s) indicated. 

2 The total electorate comes from unless another reference is given.
3 The MP is a Labour Co-op Party member but he was nominated as 'Welsh Labour'.

Target seats

Labour
Gower, Conservative, 0.1%
Vale of Clwyd, Conservative, 0.7%
Cardiff North, Conservative, 4.2%

Conservative
Bridgend, Labour, 4.9%
Wrexham, Labour, 5.6%
Clwyd South, Labour, 6.9%
Delyn, Labour, 7.8%
Alyn and Deeside, Labour, 8.1%
Newport West, Labour, 8.7%

Plaid Cymru
Ynys Môn, Labour, 0.7%
Ceredigion, Liberal Democrats, 8.2%

Opinion polling

See also
 2015 United Kingdom general election in England
 2015 United Kingdom general election in Northern Ireland
 2015 United Kingdom general election in Scotland

References

2015 in Wales
2010s elections in Wales
Wales
2015